Bjørn Berger (19 December 1919 – 27 April 1995) was a Norwegian footballer. He played in one match for the Norway national football team in 1945.

References

External links
 

1919 births
1995 deaths
Norwegian footballers
Norway international footballers
Place of birth missing
Association football defenders
Fredrikstad FK players